The Nyurolka is a river in Tomsk Oblast, Russia, a right tributary of the Vasyugan.

References

External links 
 Article in the Great Soviet Encyclopedia

Rivers of Tomsk Oblast